Joseph R. De Roo (12 July 1932 in Aarsele – 18 October 2001 in Tokyo) was a friar at the Institute of Japanese Studies in Tokyo. He developed the De Roo Kanji classification system which allows one to look up Kanji efficiently.

References

1932 births
2001 deaths
Belgian translators
20th-century translators